U.S. Route 6 (US 6) is a transcontinental United States Numbered Highway, stretching from Bishop, California, in the west to Provincetown, Massachusetts, in the east. The California portion of US 6 lies in the eastern portion of the state from Bishop in the Owens Valley north to the Nevada state line in Mineral County. Prior to the 1964 state highway renumbering, US 6 extended to the Pacific Ocean in Long Beach, California, as part of the historic auto trail named the Grand Army of the Republic Highway.

Route description
The segment of US 6 in California primarily runs north–south despite the course of the rest of the highway being east–west.

Starting in Inyo County, US 6 begins its route at Bishop at a junction with US 395 near the Bishop Paiute Tribe. After leaving Inyo County and entering Mono County, the highway proceeds due north to the town of Benton and makes a junction with State Route 120 (SR 120). The highway then begins ascending the lower foothills of the White Mountains, toward Montgomery Pass in Nevada. The highway reaches the state line before cresting the pass. While still in California, the highway passes Boundary Peak, the highest point in Nevada.

US 6 is part of the California Freeway and Expressway System and is part of the National Highway System, a network of highways that are considered essential to the country's economy, defense, and mobility by the Federal Highway Administration. US 6 is eligible to be included in the State Scenic Highway System, but it is not officially designated as a scenic highway by the California Department of Transportation.

History

The California portion of US 6 was originally commissioned in 1937 as an extension of the highway from Greeley, Colorado, as part of the historic Grand Army of the Republic Highway auto trail.

Grand Army of the Republic Highway
US 6 was later extended further south through the Mojave Desert and Los Angeles to Long Beach in Southern California. It traveled along with what is now US 395, SR 14 (Sierra Highway), I-5, I-110/SR 110, and SR 1. When the Four Level Interchange was constructed, US 6 was the original number for SR 110 at this interchange.

It formerly ran from Long Beach west to San Pedro and continued north on Figueroa Street, briefly concurrent with US 66 in Los Angeles before turning northwest and cosigning with US 99 on San Fernando Road. US 66 continued north on the Arroyo Seco Freeway before also being decommissioned in 1964, leading to the Harbor and Arroyo Seco freeways being redesignated to SR 11, which ran from Gaffey Street in San Pedro to Colorado Boulevard in Pasadena. In 1981, the Harbor Freeway between Gaffey Street and I-10 became I-110, replacing the SR 11 designation. The northern segment of SR 11 continuing to Glenarm Street became SR 110, which continues briefly as the Harbor Freeway before becoming the Pasadena Freeway north of the Four Level Interchange with US 101.

Renumbering
In 1964, all the route of US 6 in California south of Bishop lost official status with its US 6 signs removed. The highway was truncated to Bishop as part of the 1964 state highway renumbering. In 2007, the state legislature recognized the decommissioned segment as Historic US 6 and approved the placement of such Historic US 6 signage along the old alignment.

Major intersections

See also

Midland Trail
Category: Historic trails and roads in California

References

External links

AARoads - U.S. Route 6 in California
California Highways: U.S. Route 6
Caltrans: U.S. Route 6 highway conditions
Socalregion.com: Virtual Tour of U.S. Route 6 in California and western Nevada

06
 California
U.S. Route 06
U.S. Route 06
Historic trails and roads in California
Owens Valley